Shirley Page is an English international lawn and indoor bowler.

Bowls career
In 1993, she won the triples silver medal and fours bronze medal at the inaugural Atlantic Bowls Championships.

In 1998 she represented England at the 1998 Commonwealth Games in Kuala Lumpur and won a bronze medal.

Four years later she was part of the gold medal winning team in the fours at the 2002 Commonwealth Games in Manchester along with Ellen Alexander, Gill Mitchell and Carol Duckworth.

Page is also a four times national champion representing Hertfordshire.

References

Living people
1940 births
Commonwealth Games medallists in lawn bowls
Commonwealth Games gold medallists for England
Commonwealth Games bronze medallists for England
English female bowls players
Bowls players at the 1998 Commonwealth Games
Bowls players at the 2002 Commonwealth Games
Medallists at the 1998 Commonwealth Games
Medallists at the 2002 Commonwealth Games